This is the discography of British singer Mari Wilson.

Albums

Studio albums

Compilation albums

EPs

Singles

Notes

References

Discographies of British artists
Pop music discographies
Jazz discographies